Trocon is a lava dome complex in Argentina. It has two summit craters and a pyroclastic cone. It is of estimated Pleistocene-Holocene age. The volume of the edifice is ill-defined, ranging . Lava flows extend eastward from a pyroclastic cone.

See also
 List of volcanoes in Argentina

References
 
 
 

Mountains of Argentina
Volcanoes of Neuquén Province
Pleistocene lava domes
Holocene lava domes
Polygenetic volcanoes